The T2 is a trunk road in Zambia. The road runs from the Tunduma border with Tanzania via Mpika, Kabwe and Lusaka to the Chirundu border with Zimbabwe. The route from Mpika to Kafue is a toll road. The route from Tanzania to Lusaka is Zambia's Great North Road and is part of the Tanzam Highway.

For its entire route, the T2 is part of the Cape to Cairo Road. Also, the section from the T3 road junction in Kapiri Mposhi to the T1 road  junction just after Kafue is part of the Walvis Bay-Ndola-Lubumbashi Development Road.

Route

Much of the route forms Zambia's Great North Road and the entire route is part of the famed Cape to Cairo Road.

Muchinga Province

The T2 road begins from Zambia's Border Post with Tanzania near Tunduma as the Tanzam Highway. On the Tanzanian side, it is the T1 road to Iringa and Dar es Salaam. It starts by meeting the northern terminus of the M14 road (which connects to the Mafinga Hills) before passing south-west through the town centre of Nakonde.

The name Great North Road used to apply to the M1 road up to the Mbala Border with Tanzania, but the name has since been given to the T2 road to Nakonde, due to its direct route to important Towns in Tanzania.

Central Province

From Mpika, the T2 road makes a  Journey south-south-west, through the Chilonga Toll Plaza, through Lavushimanda District, crossing into Central Province and passing through Chitambo District, to Serenje.  before Serenje, at the town of Chitambo, the T2 meets a direct road to Luapula Province, named the Serenje-Samfya Road (opened in 1983; designated as the D235 on the Zambian road network), which is used by motorists to access Luapula Province quickly.

From Serenje, the T2 makes a  journey west-south-west, through the farming town of Mkushi, through the George Kunda SC Toll Plaza, to Kapiri Mposhi. From the Tanzania Border Post at Nakonde, the T2 is accompanied to Kapiri Mposhi by a railway named the Tanzania-Zambia Railway (TAZARA Railway).

At Kapiri Mposhi, the T2 road meets the southern terminus of the T3 road from Ndola and Kitwe in the Copperbelt Province and the Kasumbalesa border with DR Congo in the north. They meet at a T-junction. As the T3 Route ends at this junction, the T2 Route becomes the road southwards towards Kapiri Mposhi Central.

After Chibombo, at the junction with the M20 road to Mumbwa (this junction is famously known as Landless Corner), the T2 road turns south-east and quickly enters Chisamba District (bypassing the farming town of Chisamba to the west; where the D176 provides access to the Chisamba Town Centre), before turning directly south towards Lusaka and passing through the Katuba Toll Plaza, where it re-enters Chibombo District (passing through the Katuba Constituency).

Lusaka Province

Next, the T2 leaves Chibombo District, Central Province and enters Lusaka, Zambia's Capital City, in the Province of the same name. It enters just before the National Heroes Stadium (at the suburb of Kabangwe). At the roundabout at the northern end of the City Centre, the T2 Route meets the T4 Route (Great East Road) from Chongwe and Chipata (and the republics of Malawi & Mozambique) and the M9 Road from Mumbwa and Mongu. This junction of the Great Roads of Zambia marks the end of the T2 being known as the Tanzam Highway.

Right after this roundabout, the T2 becomes Cairo Road, an avenue with many trees and businesses on the road and where heavy vehicles are not permitted to pass. (Trucks are advised to use Lumumba Road to bypass the City Centre to the west and come back on the T2 south of the City Centre)

At the southern end of the City Centre, the T2 has a roundabout again, where it meets Lusaka's Independence Avenue and becomes Kafue Road. At the next junction, the southern end of Lumumba Road is met. This is where heavy vehicles going northwards are advised to join Lumumba Road to skip the town centre and bypass it to the west. (This is also where heavy vehicles going southwards rejoin the main road)

Going south of Lusaka, the road is named Kafue Road. Approximately  after the Kafue Town Centre, the T2 Route crosses the Kafue River as the Kafue Bridge into Southern Province, entering Chikankata District.

Southern Province 
In Chikankata District (just after the Kafue River crossing), at a junction usually known as Turnpike, the T2 meets the north-eastern terminus of the Lusaka–Livingstone road (T1 road) from Mazabuka, Choma, Livingstone and the Victoria Falls (with links to Botswana, Namibia and north-western Zimbabwe).

The village on the other side of the border is also named Chirundu.

 before Chirundu, the T2 meets the M15 road, which is the road that provides access to the tourist town of Siavonga on the Zambezi River near Kariba Dam and a border connecting to the town of Kariba on the Zimbabwean side.

As the Cape to Cairo Road, The T2 becomes the Chirundu-Beitbridge Regional Road Corridor in Zimbabwe, which connects to South Africa.

Road Network
The T2 between the Tanzania border and the T1 road junction south of Kafue is part of the Trans-African Highway 4 (Cairo-Cape Town Highway), which connects Cairo in Egypt with Cape Town in South Africa. (the Cairo-Cape Town Highway continues from Kafue south-westwards as the T1 road)

The T2 between the T3 road junction in Kapiri Mposhi and the Zimbabwe border is part of the Trans-African Highway 9 (Beira-Lobito Highway), which connects Beira in Mozambique with Lobito in Angola. (The Beira-Lobito Highway continues from Kapiri Mposhi northwards as the T3 road)

The T2 from its junction with the T3 road in Kapiri Mposhi to its junction with the T1 road south of Kafue is part of the Walvis Bay-Ndola-Lubumbashi Development Road.

The T2 from the Tanzania Border to the Cairo Road/Great East Road junction in Lusaka is part of the Tanzam Highway and is known as the Great North Road.

Great North Road

In the past, the M1 road from Mpika northwards, through Kasama, to Mbala and Mpulungu was known as Zambia's Great North Road. Then, the name Great North Road was given to the T2 road from Mpika north-east to the Tanzania Border at Nakonde, probably due to the fact that it is part of the Cape to Cairo Road. So, the M1 road is now referred to as the Old Great North Road.

The road connecting Lusaka and Livingstone (which was the capital of the nation before 1935) was originally regarded as being part of the Great North Road of Zambia. Then, after the capital of the nation became Lusaka in 1935, Lusaka was regarded as the southern terminus of the Great North Road and the road connecting Lusaka to Livingstone was no-longer regarded as part of the route.

So, Zambia's Great North Road is currently the section of the T2 road from the Tanzania Border at Nakonde to Lusaka.

Lusaka West Ring Road 
A new bypass road was constructed in Lusaka, named the Lusaka West Ring Road, as part of the Lusaka Decongestion Project (LDP). It was constructed in order for north-south traffic that has no need of stopping in Lusaka to bypass the City Centre, which is a busy commercial area, to the west. It was opened in 2020.

It starts in Kabangwe, approximately 13 kilometres north of the Lusaka Central Business District, at a junction with the T2 road (Great North Road). It passes through Lusaka West, meeting Mungwi Road, Mumbwa Road, Los Angeles Road and Makeni Road, before rejoining the T2 (Kafue Road) south of the suburb of Makeni, approximately 8 kilometres south of the Lusaka Central Business District.

The Lusaka West Ring Road eases traffic that occurs in the roads of Lusaka's central area, primarily Cairo Road and Lumumba Road, which are the main thoroughfares used to go from the southern side of the CBD to the northern side of the CBD and vice versa.

M15 Road (Zambia)
The M15 road is the  road in Southern Province connecting the tourist town of Siavonga with Chirundu. Together with the T2 road, it is the main route connecting Siavonga with the rest of the country.

It bypasses Siavonga town centre to the east and becomes the eastern wall of the Kariba Dam, where it crosses the Zambezi River borderline into the republic of Zimbabwe and becomes the P12 road to pass through the town of Kariba on the Zimbabwean side.

Lusaka-Ndola Dual Carriageway 
On 8 September 2017, President Edgar Lungu commissioned the construction of the Lusaka-Ndola Dual Carriageway. This proposed route construction would transform the T2 Road (Great North Road) from Lusaka to Kapiri Mposhi, together with the T3 Road from Kapiri Mposhi to Ndola (a total distance of 320 kilometres), into a dual carriageway to ease the movement of vehicles such as trucks, buses and motor vehicles and reduce on accidents.

This new dual carriageway would require bypasses around the towns of Kabwe and Kapiri Mposhi together with some grade-separated interchanges where necessary. Together with the already-existing Ndola-Kitwe Dual Carriageway and Kitwe-Chingola Dual Carriageway in the Copperbelt Province, this proposed road would provide a faster and safer journey from Lusaka to DR Congo. At the moment, the entire T3 from Ndola to Kapiri Mposhi, together with the T2 from Kapiri Mposhi to Lusaka, is a single carriageway with one lane in each direction.

The total cost of this 320 km road, after several increments, was finalized at $1.2 billion and construction began from Lusaka going northwards. Certain elements of society criticized the high cost of the road, as it would cost just over $3.7 million per kilometre. The deal was made with the China Jiangxi Corporation for International Economic and Technical Cooperation (CJIC) to construct the road.

However, only the section of the T2 (Great North Road) within the capital city (Lusaka District), up to the Six Miles Roundabout, has been completed as of June 2021, with the Ministry of Finance ordering for the Road Development Agency to halt the project, citing financial constraints.

In August 2021 (just after Zambia's Presidential Election), the newly-appointed Infrastructure, Housing and Urban Development Minister, Charles Milupi, stated that the road would cost less than $1.2 billion under President Hakainde Hichilema's government. Road construction would only resume once the price has been renegotiated to a lower amount; otherwise, the project has not been cancelled.

So, the newly-formed government officially cancelled the deal that the previous government made with the China Jiangxi Corporation for International Economic and Technical Cooperation (CJIC), citing that the project was overpriced.

In early 2022, Hon Charles Milupi stated that completing this dual carriageway was of high importance. He stated that they would resume works on that road at a reduced cost after the rain season would pass in Zambia. Then, the Minister of Finance, Situmbeko Musokotwane, stated that this project (Lusaka-Ndola Dual Carriageway) would be financed by "Private Public Partnerships" (PPPs).

On 28 February 2023, the Minister of Finance, Situmbeko Musokotwane, together with other ministers, re-commissioned the construction of the Lusaka-Ndola Dual Carriageway at Protea Hotel in Ndola. The project is expected to cost $577 million and is being financed by a Private Public Partnership (concession). The consortium responsible for the construction and maintenance of the road is Macro-Ocean Investment Consortium. It is expected to take 3 years to completion and the concession agreement will be for another 22 years (up to 2048).

See also 
 Great North Road, Zambia
 Transport in Zambia
 Roads in Zambia

References

Roads in Zambia